Tsunami was an experimental purpose-built racing aircraft designed and built in the United States during the 1980s. After a short undistinguished career Tsunami crashed, killing its designer, John Sandberg, on 25 September 1991.

Design and development
After 6 long years of building, the aircraft was first flown 17 August 1986 by test pilot Steve Hinton. It was designed specifically to break the 3 km world speed record for propeller driven aircraft by a private pilot and to compete in the Unlimited class at the Reno Air Races. The aircraft was designed by Bruce Boland, an aerospace engineer employed by Lockheed Martin, John R. Sandberg, owner of JRS Enterprises Inc (rebuilders of Allison and Rolls-Royce aircraft engines), Lockheed engineer Pete Law and builder Ray Poe. Tsunami, powered by a Rolls-Royce Merlin engine, designed and built by John R. Sandberg and the JRS Enterprise Inc. team, exceeded .

Originally, it was designed as a light-weight racer with a single-staged supercharged Rolls-Royce Merlin.  However, as speed increased in the Unlimited Racing Class, a higher powered two-stage supercharged Rolls-Royce Merlin was installed.  An attempt was made in August 1989 to break the  world speed record at Wendover Utah with a private pilot at the controls.  Due to a landing gear collapse the aircraft was unable to beat the existing record.

Operational history
Despite being very fast, in its racing career from 1986 to 1991 it only won one Unlimited Gold Race, in Sherman, Texas in 1990.

Fatality
The program ended in 1991 when the owner John Sandberg was killed while ferrying the aircraft to his home airport. The US National Transportation Safety Board report stated that the airspeed indicator was off on Tsunami's last flight and a mechanical failure in the flap system, caused the aircraft to roll on final approach into Pierre Regional Airport, South Dakota on 25 September 1991.

Specifications (Tsunami)

See also

References

External links

 Flying Magazine
 TsunamiAirRacing
 RebuildTsunami

Racing aircraft
Low-wing aircraft
Single-engined tractor aircraft
Aircraft first flown in 1986